Qamardeen Odunlami (born 27 August 1973) better known by his stage name Ayeloyun is a Nigerian Islamic singer and producer. He released his debut album Taqwallah in 1994 and his Igbeyawo album released in 2003 which was his 9th album and brought him prominence and spotlight.

Early life and education 
Ayeloyun was born in Agege, Lagos, Nigeria into a family of seven. In 2006, he got admitted to study Sharia and Common Law at the University of Ilorin, Kwara State but dropped out to focus on Music.

Music career 
At an early age, Ayeloyun started to explore his interest in music during an evening Arabic class at Marcaz, Agege where he sang during the ramadam Laylat al-Qadr due to the unavailability of his seniors then at the Arabic school. He started music professionally in 1992 to tackle Religious Colouration in Islam and released his first album in 1994 and has released altogether 25 albums to critical acclaim.

References 

1973 births
Living people
Nigerian Muslims
Performers of Islamic music
People from Kwara State
21st-century Nigerian male singers
Yoruba-language singers